Derek "Dez" Skinn (born 4 February 1951) is a British comic and magazine editor, and author of a number of books on comics. As head of Marvel Comics' operations in England in the late 1970s, Skinn reformatted existing titles, launched new ones, and acquired the BBC license for Doctor Who Weekly. After leaving Marvel UK, Skinn founded and edited Warrior, which featured key works by Alan Moore.

Called by some the "British Stan Lee," Skinn is one of British comics' most influential figures. He has also caused no small amount of controversy in his career, specifically related to legal issues regarding his publishing new adventures of the 1950s character Marvelman, as well as charges of plagiarism about Skinn's 2004 book Comix: The Underground Revolution.

Fandom 
Skinn first came to prominence in the world of British comics fandom. As a teenager he contributed articles to the seminal fanzine Fantasy Advertiser, published by Frank Dobson (known as the "Godfather of British Fandom"). When Dobson left for Australia in 1970, he handed the zine on to two contributors, Skinn and Paul McCartney, to continue. As editors, Skinn and McCartney expanded the magazine to include more articles and artwork. (Skinn stayed on at Fantasy Advertiser even after starting his professional career at IPC Magazines; finally leaving the fanzine in 1976.)

In 1971, Skinn and Derek "Bram" Stokes produced Comicon '71 (the British Comic Art Convention) at the Waverley Hotel in London; the guest of honor was Frank Bellamy and other guests include Frank Dickens, Mick Farren, and Edward Barker. Skinn returned in 1981 to produce the final incarnation of Comicon, co-organized with Frank Dobson. He also produced the 2005 Brighton Comic Expo.

Career

IPC 
Skinn's professional career started at IPC Magazines (now known as IPC Media) in 1970, where he was sub-editor on Whizzer and Chips, Cor!!, and Buster. He was promoted to be an editor on the Buster Book of Spooky Stories in 1975 and 1976. While at IPC, he also served as Father of the chapel of the local branch of the National Union of Journalists.

Warner Bros. 
Skinn left IPC in 1976 to expand the comics arm of Warner Communications' publishing arm, Williams Publishing. He took over editing MAD UK, Tarzan, Korak, and Larry Harmon's Laurel & Hardy, revived Monster Mag, and launched House of Hammer. Two of Skinn's publications were given Eagle Awards in 1977 — House of Hammer for "Favourite Specialist Comics Publication — Pro" and Mad UK for "Favourite Black & White Comicbook — Humour."

Starburst 
In January 1978, Skinn independently created the science fiction monthly Starburst, published under Skinn's own Starburst Publishing Ltd. Sporting the tagline "Science Fantasy in Television, Cinema and Comix," Starburst contained news, interviews, features, and reviews of science fiction material in various media (including TV, film, soundtracks, multimedia, comics and "collectibles"). Starburst won the 1978 Eagle Award for Favourite British Pro Comics Publication.

Marvel UK 
In August 1978, thanks in part to the success of Starburst, Skinn was hired by Stan Lee to reshape Marvel's floundering UK reprint division. (With issue #4, Marvel also bought and began to publish Starburst.) In his 15 months as editorial director for Marvel UK, Skinn reported directly to Lee; he reformatted the existing titles  Mighty World of Marvel (which became Marvel Comic), Star Wars Weekly, and Super Spider-Man (which became Spider-Man Comic), plus the monthlies Rampage and Savage Sword of Conan. In addition, Skinn launched Doctor Who Weekly and Hulk Comic, among many other titles — Frantic Magazine, Marvel Pocket Books, Star Heroes, TV Heroes, summer specials, winter specials, etc.

In 2010 Skinn received a Guinness World Records certificate and credit for creating the world's longest-lasting TV tie-in magazine for Doctor Who Weekly.

Quality Communications 
Leaving Marvel in 1980 for his own company, the London West End Studio System, Skinn worked primarily in advertising design for both the film and fashion industry. In 1982 he returned to publishing with his own company, Quality Communications, where Skinn founded and edited the comics anthology Warrior. Warrior went on to win 17 Eagle Awards, introduce V for Vendetta, and revive Marvelman/Miracleman.

During this period, Skinn also operated Quality Comics, "South London's top fantasy shop," located at 3 Lewisham Way, opposite Goldsmith College.

In 1990, Quality Communications launched the comics trade magazine Comics International, which Skinn published and edited for the following 16 years. His "Sez Dez" column was a regular feature in issues #100–#200, at which point Skinn sold the magazine in 2006 to Cosmic Publications. Quality went defunct as a publisher  2008.

Columnist 
Skinn now writes a column called "The Skinny" for Future plc's comics trade magazine Comic Heroes. Because of his strong beliefs in education through entertainment and the increasing world levels in illiteracy, he has recently begun working with the Abu Dhabi Music and Arts Foundation, initially chairing a discussion there on comics and literacy in the Middle East, which led to his becoming curator of the Middle East Film and Comic Con, which debuted in 2012.

Controversy

Marvelman (a.k.a. Miracleman) 
Before launching Warrior, Skinn contacted writer Alan Moore, telling him that "Marvelman's copyright had belonged to the publisher L. Miller & Son, ... that they had gone bankrupt in 1963[,] and that the rights to Marvelman had passed to the Official Receiver [and therefore] could be purchased for a very small amount..."; and asked Moore if he "would ... like to ... contribute to this new retelling of Marvelman."

A quarter-century later Moore found out that Marvelman creator "Mick Anglo had always owned the copyright, that it had never been owned by L. Miller & Son, and that they had not gone bankrupt, but had concluded their affairs quietly in 1963 .... Basically, Mick Anglo had been robbed of his ownership of [Marvelman]."  According to Moore, "I was not on the best of terms with Dez Skinn by the end of the Warrior experience. I didn't trust the man, and my opinion – for what that is worth – is that there was knowing deceit involved in the Marvelman decision."

But according to Skinn, he had met with Anglo three times before assigning creators to Marvelman and Anglo had expressed no problem with the relaunch then or for the following 20+ years. Skinn cites quotes by Mick Anglo from George Khoury's 2001 book Kimota!: The Miracleman Companion, "[Regarding ownership] I don't know; that was Miller's sort of thing ... Dez contacted me and he wanted to revive it and I said go ahead and do what you like."

After Warrior magazine folded due to poor sales, Skinn signed a deal with independent American publisher Eclipse Comics to reprint the Marvelman stories (under the title Miracleman) before continuing the storyline with new material by Moore and later Neil Gaiman. According to an editorial by then-Eclipse editor Cat Yronwode in Miracleman #24:

For Kimota!: The Miracleman Companion George Khoury interviewed both Skinn and Yronwode — separately — and asked each about the claims published in Miracleman No. 24. Skinn claimed to Khoury that "[a]bout ten years after that Miracleman No. 24 letters page," he and Yronwode had a "conversation via e-mail about that outrageous stuff." According to Skinn, Yronwode informed him that "Dean [Mullaney, Eclipse Comics co-founder,] had filled her head with those stories" and apologised to him. But when Khoury relayed this to Yronwode during his interview with her she denied it, maintaining that the "conversation with Dez Skinn about that" never happened and that she never apologised.

Comix: The Underground Revolution 
In 2004 Collins & Brown published Skinn's book Comix: The Underground Revolution. Skinn's authorship of the book was contested by Patrick Rosenkranz and Trina Robbins. Rosenkranz alleged that "Skinn's book extensively "borrowed" from [his own book] Rebel Visions: The Underground Comix Revolution 1963–1975" by using as its title "the same four words, cleverly rearranged, [used] as the subtitle of [his] book," "helping himself to quotes from many interviews [he] conducted, repeating facts and figures that [he] dug up," and "reprint[ing] seven of [his] photographs without permission." Skinn responded by insisting that "No theft was intended". Skinn claims that those seven photographs had been implemented by one of the ghost writers subcontracted by him and when he found out about it, he apologised to and paid Rosenkranz. Skinn claims also that the book title was chosen by the commissioning publisher.

Robbins noted that she wrote Chapter 6, "Girls on Top?" for Comix: The Underground Revolution but was not given credit. "... Dez e-mailed me with a request to contribute a chapter on women in the underground ... I did get paid for it ... one usually expects to be credited for what one writes". Skinn claims that he informed Robbins that no sub-contractors were credited in any of the publisher's titles, and that as the chapter was primarily about her, any such credit would have completely undermined its purported objectivity.

Awards

Eagle Award
He has won a number of Eagle Awards:

 1977: "Favourite Specialist Comics Publication — Pro," for House of Hammer (editor)
 1978: "Favourite British Pro Comics Publication," for Starburst Magazine (editor)
 1983
 "Favorite New Comic — UK," for Warrior
 "Favorite Comic — UK," for Warrior
 1985: "Best UK Title," for Warrior

National Comics Awards
The Eagle Awards were replaced during the period 1997–2003 by the National Comics Awards:
 1997: 
 "Role of Honour"
 "Best Specialist Magazine or Website," for Comics International
 1999: "Best Specialist Magazine or Website," for Comics International
 2001: "Best Specialist Magazine or Website," for Comics International
 2003: "Best Specialist Magazine or Website," for Comics International

Society of Strip Illustration 
 1982: "The Frank Bellamy Award for Lifetime Achievement"

Bibliography 
 Comix: The Underground Revolution (Collins & Brown/Thunder's Mouth, 2004) 
 Comic Art Now: The Very Best in Contemporary Comic Art and Illustration (ILEX/HarperCollins, 2008)

Notes

References
 
 
 Comic Art Now review

External links
 
 Abu Dhabi: Middle Eastern Comics and their Place in the 21st Century

Interviews
 Arndt, Richard J. Warrior bibliography and interview
 Brazilian comics website
 Down the Tubes
 5 minutes with Dez Skinn
 The Past, Present and Future of Dez Skinn
 Reem Al Meqbali interviews Dez Skinn

Comics critics
British magazine editors
Marvel UK
Living people
1951 births
Starburst (magazine) editors